Makmun Murod (24 December 1924 – 13 September 2011), was an Indonesian politician and general, who served as a member of the People's Consultative Assembly from 1977 until 1982. Previously, he served as the 11th Chief of Staff of the Indonesian Army from 1974 until 1978.

Makmun Murod was born in Baturaja, South Sumatra, on December 24, 1924, during Dutch rule. He was educated at the Hollandsch-Inlandsche School, and graduated in 1939. He joined the People's Security Agency, following the proclamation of Independence. During the Indonesian National Revolution, he served in the military. Following the end of the revolution, he remained in the military. He rose through the ranks, until he became the Chief of Staff of the Indonesian Army.

Makmun Murod died on September 13, 2011 at 12:45 at Pertamina Central Hospital, due to respiratory problems. He was buried in Kalibata Heroes Cemetery.

References

Citations

Bibliography 

 
 

Chiefs of Staff of the Indonesian Army
Members of the People's Consultative Assembly
1924 births
2011 deaths